Many places throughout the state of Michigan take their names from Native American indigenous languages. This list includes counties, townships, and settlements whose names are derived from indigenous languages in Michigan. The primary Native American languages in Michigan are Ojibwe, Odawa, and Potawatomi, all of which are dialects of Algonquin. Some other places names in Michigan are found to be derived from Sauk, Oneida, Wyandot, Abenaki, Shawnee, Mohawk, Seneca, Seminole, Iroquois, and Delaware, although many of these tribes are not found in Michigan.

Municipalities

State 
Michigan – derived from Ottawa "mishigami" meaning "large water" or "great water" in reference to the Great Lakes.
 Village of Michigan Center
 Lake Michigan

Counties 

 Alcona County – "the good plain".
 Allegan County – "the front" or "the mound builders".
 City of Allegan
 Township of Allegan
 Alpena County – "the good partridge country".
 Arenac County – "a sandy place for good footing".
 Township of Arenac
 Cheboygan County – Ojibwe word "zhaabonigan" meaning "sewing needle" or "chabwegan" meaning "a place of ore".
 City of Cheboygan
 Cheboygan River
 Cheboygan State Park
 Cheboygan Point
 Chippewa County – after the Ojibwe tribe.
 Chippewa Township in Chippewa County
 Chippewa Township in Isabella County
 Chippewa Township in Mecosta County
 Chippewa River
 Chippewa Nature Center
 Genesee County – Seneca word "jenishiyeh" meaning "beautiful valley".
 Village of Genesee
 Township of Genesee
 Hamlet of Genesee
 Gogebic County – Native American word "agogibing" meaning "water-mold lake".
 Lake Gogebic
 Lake Gogebic State Park
 Gogebic Range
 Huron County – named after the Huron people.
 Lake Huron
 Little Huron River
 Huron River (Lower Peninsula)
 Huron River (Upper Peninsula)
 Iosco County – "water light".
 Kalamazoo County – see Etymology of Kalamazoo.
 City of Kalamazoo
 Kalamazoo River
 Keweenaw County – Ojibwe word "gakiiwe-wewaning" meaning "portage" or "where portage is made".
 Keweenaw Peninsula
 Leelanau County – after a Native American woman in Schoolcraft's writings, meaning "delight of life".
 Township of Leelanau
 Lenawee County – from the Shawnee word lenawai, meaning "man".
 Mackinac County – Odawa word "michilimaciknac" meaning "great turtle", in reference to Mackinac Island.
 Mackinac Island
 Manistee County – originally called "ministigweyaa" in Ojibwe meaning "river with islands at its mouth".
 City of Manistee
 Township of Manistee
 Little Manistee River
 Manistee River
 Manistee Lake
 Mecosta County – after Potawatomi chief Mecosta.
 Mecosta Township
 Menominee County – after the Menominee people who inhabited the region.
 City of Menominee
 Menominee River
 Missaukee County – after Chief Nessaukee, which also means "large mouth of the river" in Odawa.
 Lake Missaukee
 Muskegon County – after the Muskegon River, called "mashkig" by the Ojibwe, meaning "swamp" or "marsh".
 City of Muskegon
 Little Muskegon River
 Muskegon River
 Muskegon Lake
 Newaygo County – named either for an Ojibwe leader who signed the Saginaw Treaty of 1819 or for an Ojibwe word meaning "much water".
 City of Newaygo
 Ogemaw County – Ojibwe word "ogimaa" meaning "chief".
 Township of Ogemaw
 Village of Ogemaw Springs
 Ontonagon County – from "nantounaging" meaning "my bowl is lost".
 Village of Ontonagon
 Ontonagon Township
 Ontonagon River
 Osceola County – after Chief Osceola of the Seminole.
 Township of Osceola (Houghton County).
 Township of Osceola Township
 Oscoda County – from the Ojibwa words ossin and muskoda, meaning "prairie of pebbles".
 Otsego County – Mohawk word meaning "clear water".
 City of Otsego
 Township of Otsego
 Township of Otsego Lake
 Village of Otsego Lake
 Otsego Lake
 Ottawa County – after the Odawa (Ottawa) people who inhabited the region.
 Ottawa River
 Lake Ottawa
 Saginaw County – Ojibwe word "sagenong" meaning "place of the outlet".
 City of Saginaw
 Saginaw River
 Sanilac County – Chief Sanilac of the Wyandot people.
 Shiawassee County – from the Chippewa word "shia-was-see" meaning "the river straight ahead."
 Township of Shiawassee
 Village of Shiawasseetown
 Shiawassee River
 Tuscola County – portmonteau of the Chippewa word "desakamigaa" ("flat land"), and the Latin word colonia ("colony").
 Tuscola Township
 Washtenaw County – Ojibwe word "washtenong" meaning "far away waters".

Other settlements 

 Ahmeek – Ojibwe word "amik" meaning "beaver".
 Bay de Noc
 Big Bay de Noc
 Little Bay de Noc
 Algonquin – named after the Algonquin people.
 Algonquin Lake
 Algonquin Lake (Barry County)
 Aloha
 Village of Aloha
 Assinins – from the Ojibwe word "asiniinsikaajiigibiig".
 Chesaning – Ojibwe word meaning "big rock place".
 Shared with the township of Chesaning.
 Chikaming – Indian word "chickaming" meaning "lake".
 Cohoctah – Indian word meaning "many trees in water".
 Cohoctah in Livingston County
 Dowagiac – Potawatomi word "dewje'og" meaning "fishing waters".
 Dowagiac River
 Escanaba – Ojibwe word meaning "land of the red buck" or "flat rock".
 Township of Escanaba
 Escanaba River
 Hiawatha – after Hiawatha.
 Ishpeming – Ojibwe word "ishpiming" meaning "on air".
 Juniata Township, Tuscola County – Iroquois word meaning "standing rock".
 Kalamo
 Village of Kalamo
 Kawkawlin – Ojibwe word "ogohcawning" meaning "place of pike fish".
 Village of Kawkawlin
 Kawkawlin River
 Kentucky – named after the state of Kentucky.
 Kenockee – Ojibwe word meaning "long-legged".
 Mackinaw City – Odawa word "michilimackinac" meaning "land of the great snapping turtle".
 Township of Mackinaw
 Manistique – originally "Monistique", Indian word "onamanitikong" meaning "vermillion" or "yellow thunder" after the hue of the Manistique River.
 Township of Manistique
 Manistique River
 West Branch Manistique River
 Manistique Lakes
 Meauwataka – Potawatomi word meaning "halfway", as the location is about halfway between Lake Mitchell and the Manistee River.
 Michigamme – Ojibwe word "mishigamaa" meaning "great water", also etymology for state of Michigan.
 Township of Michigamme
 Lake Michigamme
 Michigamme River
 Michigamme Reservoir
 Munising – Ojibwe word "miinising" meaning "at the island".
 Township of Munising
 Mohawk – named after the Mohawk people.
 Mohawk Lake
 Nahma – Ojibwe word "nami" meaning "sturgeon".
 Naubinway – from an Ojibwe phrase meaning "place of echoes".
 Shared with Naubinway Island.
 Neahtawanta – Odawa word "neahtawauta" meaning "placid waters".
 Negaunee – Ojibwe word "nigani" meaning "pioneer".
 Township of Negaunee
 Nottawa – Algonquin word meaning "Iroquois".
 Nottawa Township in Isabella County
 Nottawa Township in St. Joseph County
 Nottawa Creek
 Nottawa Lake
 Nunda – Seneca word meaning "where the valley meets the hill".
 Oceola – after Osceola, a Seminole chief.
 Ocqueoc
 Ocqueoc Lake
 Ocqueoc Falls
 Okemos – Ojibwe word "ogimaa" meaning "chief", also etymology of Ogemaw County.
 Omena – Ojibwe expression "o-me-nah" meaning "is that so?".
 Onaway – Indian word "onawa" meaning "awake".
 Oneida – named after the Oneida people.
 Onekama – Ojibwe word "onigama" meaning "singing water".
 Township of Onekama Township, Michigan
 Onondaga – after the Onondaga people or Onondaga County, New York.
 Township of Onondaga
 Onota – after the Oneida people of nearby Wisconsin.
 Ontwa – after an Indian maiden who lived in Detroit.
 Oshtemo – Potawatomi word meaning "headwaters".
 Shared with the township of Oshtemo in Kalamazoo County.
 Ossineke – Indian word "zhingaabewasiniigigaabawaad" meaning "where the image stones stood".
 Township of Ossineke
 Otisco – Indian word or unclear origin.
 Owosso – after Chief Wasso of the Ojibwe.
 Pokagon
 Village of Pokagon
 Petoskey – Odawa word "petosega" meaning "where the sun shines through the clouds".
 Pewamo – after Chief Pewamo.
 Pinconning – Ojibwe word "opinikaaning" meaning "place of potatoes".
 Pinconning Township
 Pinconning River
 Pokagon – after Chief Pokagon of the Potawatomi.
 Ponshewaing – Indian word meaning "peaceful waters" or "winter home".
 Pontiac – after Chief Pontiac of the Odawa.
 Quinnesec – Ojibwe word "bekweneseg" meaning "smoky".
 Sagola – derived from the local Indian word for "welcome"
 Village of Sagola
 Sandusky – Wyandot word "saundustee" meaning "water".
 Saranac – Abenaki word "zalônák:tégw" meaning "staghorn sumac cone river".
 Saugatuck – Indian word "so'hktuk" meaning "river that pours out".
 Township of Saugatuck
 Scio
 Township of Scio Township
 Sciota
 Sebewa – Indian word meaning "little creek".
 Village of Sebewa
 Sebewaing – Ojibwe wird "ziibiiweng" meaning "river place".
 Township of Sebewaing
 Sebewaing River
 Seneca – after the Seneca people.
 Township of Seneca
 Tamarack
 Tamarack River
 Tamarack Lake (Lower Peninsula)
 Tamarack Lake (Upper Peninsula)
 Tawas City  – after Chief O-ta-was.
 City of East Tawas
 Township of Tawas
 Tawas River
 Tawas Lake
 Tecumseh – after Chief Tecumseh of the Shawnee.
 Tittabawassee
 Tittabawassee River
 Tekonsha – Potawatomi word "tekonsho" meaning "resembling caribou".
 Tekonsha Township
 Topinabee – after Chief Topinabee of the Potawatomi.
 Tuscarora – after the Tuscarora people.
 Unadilla – Iroquois word meaning "meeting place".
 Wabaningo – after Wabiwindego of the Grand River Odawa.
 Wakeshma – Potawatomi word of unknown meaning.
 Waucedah – Ojibwe word meaning "talking stream".
 Wawatam – after Wawatam, an Odawa chief.
 Weesaw – after Chief Weesaw of the Potawatomi.
 Wequetonsing – Odawa word meaning "at the head of the little bay".
 Wick-A-Te-Wah
 Wyoming – from the Munsee Delaware phrase xwé:wamənk, meaning "at the big river flat".
 Zeba – Ojibwe word "ziibi" meaning "river".

Natural features

Bodies of water 

 Aginaw Lake
 Canada Creek
 Caribou Lake
 Chicago Lake
 Chicagon Lake
 Copneconic Lake
 Gogomain River
 Goguac Lake
 Hugaboom Lake
 Kanause Lake
 Kitch-iti-kipi
 Lake Chemung
 Lake Macatawa
 Shared with the Macatawa River.
 Lake Manitou
 Lake Michigan
 Lake Minnewauken
 Lake Mitigwaki
 Lake Nepessing
 Lake Ponemah
 Lake Skegemog
 Misteguay Creek
 Mitchigan River
 Munro Lake
 Munuscong Lake
 Little Munuscong River
 Munuscong River
 Munuscong Island
 Muskallonge Lake
 Nawakwa Lake
 Peshekee River
 Potagannissing River
 Quanicassee River
 Saganing River
 Sauk River
 Shinanguag Lake
 Shupac Lake
 Siskiwit Lake
 Siskiwit River
 Big Siskiwit River
 Little Siskiwit River
 Siskiwit Falls
 Tacoosh River
 Tahquamenon River
 Tahquamenon Falls
 Tahquamenon Island
 Tepee Lake
 Tioga River
 Tonawanda Lake
 Wabasis Lake
 Waiska River
 Wegwaas Lake

Islands

 Iyopawa Island
 Katechay Island
 Neebish Island – Ojibwe word "aniibiish" meaning "leaf".
 Mamajuda Island
 Manitou Island
 North Manitou and South Manitou Islands in Lake Michigan
 Naomikong Island
 Ojibway Island
 Ojibway Island (Sagniaw River)
 Squaw Island
 Waugoshance Island

Other
 Muscamoot Ridge

See also
 List of place names in the United States of Native American origin

References

Citations

Sources

 Vogel, Virgil J. (1986). Indian Names in Michigan. University of Michigan Press. .

 
History of Michigan
Michigan geography-related lists
Michigan